Multi is a shortened form of "multiple". It may refer to:

 Alternate character, in online gaming
 Multi two diamonds, a contract bridge convention
 Multirhyme, a synonym for feminine rhyme used in hip hop music
 Multi (To Heart), a character from the visual novel and anime series To Heart
 Multi-touch display

See also 
 Multiculturalism, a public policy approach for managing cultural diversity in a multiethnic society
 Multitude, a term used by some philosophers to refer to the population of the world
 Multitudes (journal), a French philosophical, political and artistic monthly review
 Multiplication, an elementary arithmetic operation
 Multitasking (disambiguation)